Conn McDunphy (born 3 February 1997) is an Irish cyclist, who currently rides for UCI Continental team .

Major results
2017
 2nd Time trial, National Under-23 Road Championships
 5th Time trial, National Road Championships
2018
 1st Stage 1 Tour of Ulster
 2nd Time trial, National Under-23 Road Championships
2019
 8th Chrono Champenois
2020
 1st  Time trial, National Road Championships
2021
 3rd Road race, National Road Championships
 6th Time trial, National Road Championships
2022
 8th PWZ Zuidenveld Tour

References

External links

1997 births
Living people
Irish male cyclists
People from County Kildare